Casa da Mãe Joana 2 is a 2013 Brazilian comedy film directed by Hugo Carvana. The film was released in Brazil on September 6, 2013.  It is a sequel of the 2008 film Casa da Mãe Joana.

Cast 
 José Wilker as Juca
 Paulo Betti as PR
 Antônio Pedro Borges as Montanha
 Betty Faria as Dona Araci
 Juliana Paes as Dolores Sol

External links
 
 

2013 films
Brazilian comedy films
2013 comedy films
2010s Portuguese-language films